ATP-sensitive inward rectifier potassium channel 12 is a lipid-gated ion channel that in humans is encoded by the KCNJ12 gene.

Function 

This gene encodes an inwardly rectifying K+ channel that may be blocked by divalent cations. This protein is thought to be one of multiple inwardly rectifying channels that contribute to the cardiac inward rectifier current (IK1). The gene is located within the Smith–Magenis syndrome region on chromosome 17.

Interactions 

KCNJ12 has been shown to interact with:

 APBA1, 
 CASK,
 DLG1, 
 DLG2, 
 DLG3, 
 DLG4, 
 LIN7A 
 LIN7B,  and
 LIN7C.

See also 
 Inward-rectifier potassium channel

References

Further reading

External links 
 

Ion channels